VGX can mean one of the following:
 The abbreviation of Vector Graphics;
 VGX (award show), the name of Spike TV's video game award show, formerly called the Spike Video Game Awards.
 The component of Microsoft Windows operating systems responsible for the vector graphics rendering.
 Virgin Galactic ICAO callsign